Zinc acetate is a salt with the formula Zn(CH3CO2)2, which commonly occurs as the dihydrate Zn(CH3CO2)2·2H2O. Both the hydrate and the anhydrous forms are colorless solids that are used as dietary supplements. When used as a food additive, it has the E number E650.

Uses
Zinc acetate is a component of some medicines, e.g., lozenges for treating the common cold.  Zinc acetate can also be used as a dietary supplement. As an oral daily supplement it is used to inhibit the body's absorption of copper as part of the treatment for Wilson's disease. Zinc acetate is also sold as an astringent in the form of an ointment, a topical lotion, or combined with an antibiotic such as erythromycin for the topical treatment of acne.  It is commonly sold as a topical anti-itch ointment.

Zinc acetate is used as the catalyst for the industrial production of vinyl acetate from acetylene:

Approximately 1/3 of the worlds production uses this route, which because it is environmentally messy, is mainly practiced in countries with relaxed environmental regulations such as China.

Preparation
Zinc acetates are prepared by the action of acetic acid on zinc carbonate or zinc metal.  Treatment of zinc nitrate with acetic anhydride is an alternative route.

Structures
In anhydrous zinc acetate the zinc is coordinated to four oxygen atoms to give a tetrahedral environment, these tetrahedral polyhedra are then interconnected by acetate ligands to give a range of polymeric structures.

In the dihydrate, zinc is octahedral, wherein both acetate groups are bidentate.

Reactions
Heating Zn(CH3CO2)2 in a vacuum results in a loss of acetic anhydride, leaving a residue of "basic zinc acetate," with the formula Zn4O(CH3CO2)6. It can also be prepared by a reaction of glacial acetic acid with zinc oxide. The cluster compound has a tetrahedral structure with an oxide ligand at its center  Basic zinc acetate is a common precursor to metal-organic frameworks (MOFs).

See also
 Basic beryllium acetate - isostructural with basic zinc acetate

References

acetate
zinc
E-number additives